Lakshmipur is a town in Bangladesh. It also may refer to:

Bangladesh
Lakshmipur District
Lakshmipur Sadar Upazila

India
Lakshmipur, Orissa
Lakshmipuram, Theni, Tamil Nadu
Lakshmipuram, Chennai, Tamil Nadu
Lakshmipuram Palace, the royal palace of the Parappanad royal families at Changanassery
Lakshmipuram College of Arts and Science
Lakshmipuram, Mysore, a neighborhood in Mysore, Karnataka
Laxmipuram, Srikakulam, Andhra Pradesh

Nepal
Lakshmipur Patari
Lakshmipur, Dang